The Regino River is a small coastal river in the department of Haute-Corse, Corsica, France.

Course

It crosses the communes of Belgodère, Feliceto, Occhiatana, Speloncato, Santa-Reparata-di-Balagna and Ville-di-Paraso.

The Regino rises in the canton of Feliceto to the west of the  San Parteo mountain.
It flows in a north-northwest direction, passing between the villages of Feliceto and Nessa, then turns to run in a northeast direction to its mouth on the sea.
It is dammed to the south of L'Île-Rousse to form the Lac de Codole.
The dam was built in the early 1980s by the Société de Développement Agricole de la Corse (SOMIVAC) to supply water to the eastern part of the Balagne for drinking and irrigation.

Watershed

The Reginu valley has a Mediterranean climate, with little rain in the summer.
It regularly has strong west or southwest winds.
The landscape includes pastures, cultivated olive, almond and citrus groves, and abandoned scrub and forest.
Vegetation includes heather (Erica arborea), Arbutus unedo, oak forests (Quercus ilex, Quercus suber and some Quercus pubescens), lavender (Lavandula stoechas), rosemary (Rosmarinus officinalis), Genista corsica and many Cistus species.

Hydrology

Measurements of the river flow were taken at the Speloncato [Regino] station from 1968 to 1989.

Tributaries
The following streams (ruisseaux) are tributaries of the Regino, ordered by length:

 San Clemente 
 Erbaiola 
 Carignelli 
 Piano 
 Novalella 
 Aldinu 
 Cammariu 
 Canne 
 Saltu 
 Campumignani 
 Piombone 
 Cervione 
 Valdu Alle Grotte

Gallery

Notes

Sources

Rivers of Haute-Corse
Rivers of France
Coastal basins of the Mediterranean Sea in Corsica